Villy Sundström (born February 6, 1949) is a Swedish physical chemist known for his work in ultrafast science and molecular photochemistry using time-resolved laser and X-ray spectroscopy techniques.

Education and career 
Sundström studied chemistry at Umeå University, obtaining his PhD in 1977. During his study, he visited Bell Labs and worked under Peter Rentzepis. Upon his return to Sweden, he started building the first ultrafast spectroscopy laboratory in Scandinavia at Umeå University and later at Lund University in Sweden. In 1994, Sundström was appointed professor of Chemical Dynamics and head of the Chemical Physics Department at Lund University. His group's research centers on the photophysics and photochemical processes in model systems of natural and artificial photosynthetic light harvesting, such as bacteriochlorophyll, carotenoids, transition metal complexes, organic and perovskite solar cells.

Sundström was an editor of the journal Chemical Physics Letters.

Bibliography

Selected articles

Reviews

Books

References 

1949 births
Swedish chemists
Umeå University alumni
Academic staff of Lund University
Academic staff of Umeå University
Spectroscopists
Swedish physical chemists
Photochemists
Living people
Scientists at Bell Labs
20th-century Swedish chemists
21st-century Swedish chemists